The Legend of Kaspar Hauser is a feature film written and directed by Davide Manuli, it is a surreal drama based on "the legend" of Kaspar Hauser. In this modern western-like re-interpretation featuring Vincent Gallo, a music-obsessive Kaspar washes up on a Mediterranean beach, where half a dozen protagonists try to make sense of who he is.

The film premiered at the 2012 Rotterdam International Film Festival.

References

External links
 

2012 films
2010s Italian-language films
English-language Italian films
2010s English-language films
Italian black-and-white films
Kaspar Hauser
Films set in the Mediterranean Sea
Films set on beaches
2012 multilingual films
Italian multilingual films

Italian avant-garde and experimental films
2010s Italian films